Idalia Hechavarría Vaillant (born 5 June 1974) is a Cuban sprinter. She competed in the women's 4 × 100 metres relay at the 1996 Summer Olympics.

References

1974 births
Living people
Athletes (track and field) at the 1996 Summer Olympics
Cuban female sprinters
Olympic athletes of Cuba
Place of birth missing (living people)
Pan American Games medalists in athletics (track and field)
Pan American Games bronze medalists for Cuba
Athletes (track and field) at the 1999 Pan American Games
Medalists at the 1999 Pan American Games
Central American and Caribbean Games medalists in athletics
Olympic female sprinters
20th-century Cuban women